Id (stylized as [id]) is the third studio album by American metalcore band Veil of Maya. It was released through Sumerian Records on April 6, 2010. They worked with producer Michael Keene of death metal band The Faceless on this album. Keene previously worked with the band, producing their previous album The Common Man's Collapse. It is the band's only album to feature bassist Matthew C. Pantelis.

Culture references
The name of the album is a reference to the Freudian concept of the Id part of the structural part of the human psyche.
The breakdowns in the song "Namaste" are actually written in-key to the mythic numbers featured on the television series Lost (4 8 15 16 23 42). Also, the chorus of the song has the lyric "Live together, die alone," which is a reference to the episode of the same name from the series.  
The song "Dark Passenger" is written about the television series Dexter.

Track listing

Personnel
Veil of Maya
 Brandon Butler – vocals
 Marc Okubo – guitars
 Matthew C. Pantelis – bass guitar
 Sam Applebaum – drums

Additional personnel
 Produced by Michael Keene of The Faceless

Appearances 
The ninth song "Namaste" is featured in the game Rock Band 3 as downloadable content via the Rock Band Network

Charts

References

2010 albums
Veil of Maya albums
Sumerian Records albums